The 2001 Badminton Asia Cup was the 3rd edition of the Badminton Asia Cup. It was held in Singapore indoor stadium, Singapore from 2 May to 6 May with total prize money of 150,000 US Dollars. Tournament consisted of total of three matches in every team encounter, with format of Men's singles, Men's doubles and a second Men's singles match. Countries participated in this tournaments were Indonesia, Malaysia, Thailand, Hong Kong, South Korea, Singapore, Japan & China. Draw was conducted on 27 April 2001. Winning team China got US$80,000 while runner-up team South Korea got US$40,000. Indonesia finished third by defeating Thailand in Bronze medal tie and received a total of US$20,000 and 4th ranked Thai team settled with prize money of US$10,000.

Group results

Group A 
1) Indonesia V/s Singapore

2) South Korea V/s Hong Kong

3) Indonesia V/s Hong Kong

4) South Korea V/s Singapore

5) Indonesia V/s South Korea

6) Hong Kong V/s Singapore

Group B 
1) Malaysia V/s Japan

2) China V/s Thailand

3) Malaysia V/s Thailand

4) China V/s Japan

5) Japan V/s Thailand

6) China V/s Malaysia

Semifinals 
1) Indonesia V/s China

2) South Korea V/s Thailand

Bronze medal tie 
Indonesia V/s Thailand

Final 
China V/s South Korea

References 

Asia Cup,2001
Asia Cup
2001 in Singaporean sport
Sports competitions in Singapore
International sports competitions hosted by Singapore